The maqta is the last sher  of a ghazal, a collection of Urdu poems and the poet's takhallus, or pen name, is usually employed in it, often in very creative ways.

A shayar can use the maqta in a variety of interesting ways. He can "talk to himself", "to somebody else",  "refer to something" etc. For example Firaq Gorakhpuri, whose takhallus is the word for the common theme in Urdu poetry of the state of pining for the beloved, plays on his pen name and the word firaq:

Roman Urdu:
Tu yeh na samajh ke Firaq teri Firaq mein hai
Firaq uski Firaq mein hai jo teri Firaq mein hai

 
English Translation:
Don't think that Firaq pines for you
Firaq pines for the one who pines for you

Examples 
A sher by Mir Taqi Mir:

Mir in neem baaz aankhon mein

Saari masti sharaab ki see hai

Another by Mirza Ghalib:

 

Kaba kis munh se jaaoge Ghalib

sharm tum ko magar nahiN aati

See also
Takhallus
Ghazal
Urdu poetry
Matla

References 

Ghazal
Urdu-language poetry